Sihvola is a Finnish surname. Notable people with the surname include:

Aukusti Sihvola (1895–1947), Finnish sport wrestler
Juha Sihvola (1957–2012), Finnish philosopher and historian
Pekka Sihvola (born 1984), Finnish footballer
Anna Sihvola (born 1993), Finnish surfer

Finnish-language surnames